Offerton is a hamlet and civil parish in the Derbyshire Dales district, in Derbyshire, England. It lies on the River Derwent. The village features Offerton House, a Grade II* listed building.

See also
Listed buildings in Offerton, Derbyshire

References

Hamlets in Derbyshire
Towns and villages of the Peak District
Derbyshire Dales